Chiromachla restrictum is a moth of the  family Erebidae. It is found in Democratic Republic of Congo, Ethiopia, Ghana, Kenya, Nigeria, Tanzania and Uganda.

References

Nyctemerina
Moths described in 1894